The 1992–93 Bulgarian Cup was the 53rd season of the Bulgarian Cup. CSKA Sofia won the competition, beating Botev Plovdiv 1–0 in the final at the Hristo Botev Stadium in Blagoevgrad.

First round

|-
!colspan=5 style="background-color:#D0F0C0;" |4 / 7 November 1992

|-
!colspan=5 style="background-color:#D0F0C0;" |7 / 14 November 1992

|}

Second round

|-
!colspan=5 style="background-color:#D0F0C0;" |6 / 12 December 1992

|}

Quarter-finals

|-
!colspan=5 style="background-color:#D0F0C0;" |24 March / 7 April 1993

|-
!colspan=5 style="background-color:#D0F0C0;" |24 March / 21 April 1993

|}

Semi-finals

|-
!colspan=5 style="background-color:#D0F0C0;" |5 / 19 May 1993

|}

Final

Details

References

1992-93
1992–93 domestic association football cups
Cup